Pradera is a Spanish surname meaning "meadow". Notable people with the surname include:

Javier Pradera (1934–2011), Spanish activist and journalist
Jeidi Pradera (born 1998), Cuban cyclist
Mikel Pradera (born 1975), Spanish cyclist
Nicolasa Pradera (1870–1959), Spanish chef, restaurateur and cookbook writer
Víctor Pradera Larumbe (1872–1936), Spanish political theorist and politician

Spanish-language surnames